Pantanodon is a genus of poeciliids native to East Africa and Madagascar.

Species
There are currently two recognized species in this genus:
 Pantanodon madagascariensis (Arnoult, 1963)
 Pantanodon stuhlmanni (C. G. E. Ahl, 1924) (Eastcoast lampeye)

References 

 
Poeciliidae
Fish of Africa
Freshwater fish genera
Taxa named by George S. Myers
Taxonomy articles created by Polbot